Hamburg Planetarium is one of the world's oldest, and one of Europe's most visited planetariums. It is located in the district of Winterhude, Hamburg, Germany, and housed in a former water tower at the center of Hamburg Stadtpark.

History 
Planetarium Hamburg opened to the public on April 30, 1930. It is situated in an Art-Deco water tower, designed by Oskar Menzel and built between 1912 and 1915. However, it was only used as such until 1924, and subsequently converted to a planetarium. At the opening of the planetarium in 1930, a Zeiss Universarium Mark II projector, already acquired by the City of Hamburg in 1925, became the planetarium's centerpiece. Subsequent Zeiss projectors were a Mark IV in 1957, a Mark VI in 1983 and a Universarium IX since 2006.

In 2011 Planetarium Hamburg became one of the first ESO Outreach Partner Organisations (EOPO) of the European Southern Observatory (ESO). The same year, Planetarium Hamburg became the first planetarium in Europe to use fulldome 3D-Stereoscopic technology.

With the start of reconstruction from 3 August 2015, the Planetarium is closed until the end of 2016. The core of the work is the development of the entrance from the outside pedestal on which the water tower stands. From 2017 the new premises and service facilities will provide all visitors of the Hamburg Planetarium improved access, more space, more comfort and advanced conference facilities. In the on city park level emerging areas in the base and the extended, previous lobby level on the first floor will be the new place for gastronomy, Shop, events, exhibitions, offices and toilets provided. Access to the planetarium will take place in the future at ground level from the City Park. Two elevators will in future facilitate access to the Star Hall and the popular observation deck, which also will be barrier-free for the first time then. The expansion will bring the added value of an area of approximately 1,200 square meters floor space with them.

See also 

 Hamburg Observatory
 List of planetariums

References

External links

 Information for our English speaking visitors (Planetarium Hamburg) 

Planetaria in Germany
Planetarium
Planetarium
Science museums in Germany
Planetarium
Museums established in 1930
1930 establishments in Germany
Planetarium